Simon Nielsen (born 1 October 1990) is a Danish motorcycle speedway rider who rode in the Denmark U-19 national team.

Career
Born in Stenlille, Nielsen won 2005 Individual Speedway FIM Youth Gold Trophy 80 cc, unofficial U-16 World Championship.

In 2011 he came to the UK to try to get a team place and got a place in the Workington Comets team towards the end of the season. In December 2011 he was announced as the final member of the 2012 Leicester Lions team in the British Premier League. After an injury early in the season, he showed good form before suffering a broken femur in a crash with team mate Jari Mäkinen on 23 June. Simon re-signed for Leicester Lions for the 2013 Premier League season. In May 2013 he was dropped by the Lions with his place going to Alex Edberg. In June he signed for Plymouth Devils. In 2014 he signed for Newcastle Diamonds, staying with the team for 2015.

Career details

European Championships 
 Individual U-19 European Championship
 2008 -  Stralsund - 10th place (7 pts)
 2009 - 18th place in Semi-Final 2 (injury)
 Team U-19 European Championship
 2008 -  Rawicz - 3rd place (4 pts)
 2009 -  Holsted - 3rd place (1 pt)

Domestic competitions 
 Team Polish Championship
 2008 - 1st place in Second League (Average 0.750 in 4 heats) for Gniezno
 2009 - First League for Gniezno

See also 
 Denmark national speedway team

References

External links 
  (in Danish)

1990 births
Living people
Danish speedway riders
Workington Comets riders
Leicester Lions riders
Plymouth Devils riders
Newcastle Diamonds riders
People from Sorø Municipality
Sportspeople from Region Zealand